The main article describes all European Soling Championships from one the first held in 1968 to the announced Championships in the near future. This article states the detailed results, where relevant the controversies, and the progression of the Championship during the series race by race of the European Soling Championships in the years 1980, 1981, 1982, 1983 and 1984. This is based on the major sources: World Sailing, the world governing body for the sport of sailing recognized by the IOC and the IPC, and the publications of the International Soling Association. Unfortunately not all crew names are documented in the major sources.

1980 Final results 

After the last race the International Jury needed three hours to make the decision about three boats that passed between the control boat and the gate launch during a gate start in race 6. One of them was the team of SR 27 Boris Budnikov. The final decision was that these three competitors retain their place as finished.

Detailed results are documented of the top 10 teams. The ranking and the net total of the other competitors is also documented.

 1980 Progress

1981 Final results 

During Race 6 a team member of Z 232 team Heiki Blok felt overboard and was pickup and returned to his teammates by G 212 team Fritz Geis at that time leader in the event. This very sportive action of G 212 was rewarded by the International jury, after the final race, by reducing his finished position by 5 places. In the final race the both leaders G 212 and OE 73 team Michael Farthofer went over the starting line too early and were disqualified. Team Jörg Hermann DDR 5 then needed a 2nd place to win the event. They however finished 4th and 2nd in the overall ranking.

 1981 Progress

1982 Final results 

Due to difficult race conditions the Dragør Sejlklub race committee needed to use the gate start procedure and the black flag rule many times during this event. The committee finally was able to produce five great races. Two races could not take place. As result there was no discard.

 1982 Progress

1983 Final results 

This was the first major Soling event where ALL crew members were documented. The role of each crew member became more and more respected! In 1968 and beyond boat names and sail numbers were the top priority of the International Soling Association because that give a good insight of the growth of the class. The organization was more or less an organization of boat owners. This changed during the 80's into an organization for Soling Sailors!

 1983 Progress

1984 Not held due to Olympic Games

Further results
For further results see:
 Soling European Championship results (1968–1979)
 Soling European Championship results (1980–1984)
 Soling European Championship results (1985–1989)
 Soling European Championship results (1990–1994)
 Soling European Championship results (1995–1999)
 Soling European Championship results (2000–2004)
 Soling European Championship results (2005–2009)
 Soling European Championship results (2010–2014)
 Soling European Championship results (2015–2019)
 Soling European Championship results (2020–2024)

References

Soling European Championships